Paul Salamunovich KCSG (June 7, 1927April 3, 2014) was a Grammy-nominated, American conductor and educator.

He was the Music Director of the Los Angeles Master Chorale from 1991 to 2001 and its Music Director Emeritus from 2001 until his death in 2014.  He served as Director of Music at St. Charles Borromeo Church in North Hollywood, California, for 60 years between 1949 and 2009. In addition, he held academic positions at a number of Southern California universities. He was also a master clinician, having been invited to conduct just under 1000 festivals and workshops around the world including an unprecedented four consecutive ACDA national conventions—all with different groups.

He was acknowledged as an expert in Gregorian chant and has long been recognized for his contributions in the field of sacred music, most notably receiving a Pro Ecclesia et Pontifice, the highest laity award from the papacy in 2013 and was appointed knight of the Order of St Gregory the Great from Pope Paul VI in 1969.

Biography

Personal history

The youngest of five sons born to immigrant parents from what is now Croatia, he was born in Redondo Beach, California where he attended St. James Elementary School.  Salamunovich recalled a pivotal moment in his life when he was about 8 years old and attended a double feature at the local movie house. At the end of both films during a MovieTone newsreel, a story about the buildup of tensions in Europe featured eight bars of a cappella music which so captivated him, he sat through both films again for another four hours just to hear that same music one more time when the newsreel repeated. It turned out to be the Sancta Maria portion of the Vittoria Ave Maria which became one of his signature conducting pieces throughout his career. When a young priest, Father Louis Buechner, arrived at the parish and started a boy's choir, Salamunovich joined and, as he says, "I was hooked."  This choir sang exclusively in Gregorian chant, and "all we did was sing funerals," he said. This early foundation in Gregorian chant, he added, "influenced the music I specialize in, and the techniques I use."

In 1940, at the age of 13, Salamunovich and his family moved to Hollywood, California, where they joined a new church, Blessed Sacrament, and attended its parochial school. The men's and boy's choirs were led by Richard Keys Biggs, the organ teacher of famed choral director Roger Wagner. Despite starting in the boy's choir three years older than was typical, Salamunovich impressed Biggs with his tone, and was allowed to join.  He remained in the choir after moving to Hollywood High School the following year.  At age 14, he began singing with Wagner.

At Hollywood High School, he met Dorothy Hilton, and they became high school sweethearts.  (They later married on May 20, 1950, and  had five children.)  Upon graduation from high school in 1945, he enlisted in the United States Navy and spent a year in Pearl Harbor, replacing sailors  sent home after World War II.

Singing and conducting career
After completing his Naval enlistment, Salamunovich returned to Southern California at the age of 19.  Hearing of his return, Roger Wagner contacted Salamunovich and asked him to join his newly formed Los Angeles Concert Youth Chorus, whose other members included 13-year-old Marilyn Horne and 14-year-old Marni Nixon; this choir later evolved into the Roger Wagner Chorale in 1948.  Wagner eventually suggested that Salamunovich study music in college at Los Angeles City College where he achieved an associate of arts degree and his classmates included future collaborator, Jerry Goldsmith.  This led to the beginning of his professional career in music. Salamunovich was regularly hired as a professional singer on both live performances and in recordings for such conductors and composers as Arturo Toscanini, Alfred Wallenstein, Igor Stravinsky and others, singing on all styles of popular and classical music. He sang the tenor solo on César Franck's Panis Angelicus on The Wagner Chorale's album, "The House of The Lord". He was one of the quartet of jazz great Stan Kenton's vocal group, "The Modern Men" who sang on Kenton's album, "Kenton With Voices" in 1957. He was a "ghost singer" along with Horne, Nixon, and a semi-regular group of contract singers on multiple film soundtrack recordings between 1946 and 1964, when his increasing conducting duties no longer allowed him the time for studio singing. He soon began contracting and conducting choral segments in films for the next 45 years.

When Wagner was offered a better-paying church job, he decided to install the 21-year-old Salamunovich as choir director at St. Charles Borromeo Church in North Hollywood, California in 1949 so that he was free to leave his position there. With great trepidation due to his complete lack of any previous conducting experience, Salamunovich reluctantly accepted the position at Wagner's insistence. For the next sixty years, he led the choir in regular services and a number of high-profile performances, including multiple appearances at the American Choral Directors Association (ACDA) Biennial National Conventions.  Most notably, the St. Charles Choir sang for Pope John Paul II in a private audience at the Vatican, for the official Mass of Greeting with  John Paul II presiding in St. Vibiana's Cathedral in Los Angeles, and in St. Peter's Square on the Feasts of St. Peter and St. Paul with John Paul II presiding at high Mass. They hold the distinction of being the only American choir to be honored with this invitation. The St. Charles Choir has performed on the soundtracks of the motion pictures "Flatliners", "Grand Canyon" and "True Confessions", for which Salamunovich also coached Robert De Niro on the sung responses of the Latin Mass. The choir also performed on television programs, including The NBC Doc Severinsen Christmas Special, "The Sounds of Christmas" that played for a number of years on Christmas Eve in place of "The Tonight Show." His St. Charles Boy's Choir served as the Disneyland Boy's Choir on the original "It's A Small World" album. They also performed on television in the Dinah Shore Chevy Special, The Lucy Show, and in films including  the Bette Davis film "Dead Ringer", and on the soundtrack of "The Godfather". Former boy's choir members include Admiral Michael Mullen, Chairman of the Joint Chiefs of Staff, and former UCLA football coach Terry Donahue. Salamunovich retired from St. Charles in June 2009, after 60 years there.

Salamunovich was hired to conduct the choirs at Mount St. Mary's college during the late 1950s and while teaching there, received his bachelor's degree in 1961. In 1964, Father Richard Trame, S.J. brought Salamunovich out to then, Loyola Marymount University (Los Angeles) to start a choral department from scratch. By the time Salamunovich left there to take over as conductor of the Los Angeles Master Chorale in 1991, he had brought Loyola Marymount's Choral department to preeminence as one of the nation's leading collegiate choral programs and he regularly conducted major works and premiers there. Salamunovich was honored with an honorary doctorate from LMU and was one of the inaugural inductees into the university's Faculty Hall of Fame.

He served as assistant conductor of the Roger Wagner Chorale from 1953 to 1977.  When Wagner formed the Los Angeles Master Chorale, Salamunovich became assistant conductor of the Master Chorale.  In this capacity, he led the majority of the Master Chorale's rehearsals, with Wagner stepping in to conduct the performances and some of the dress rehearsals. He also prepared the Master Chorale and other choirs for numerous performances with the Los Angeles Philharmonic, including those conducted by Igor Stravinsky, Bruno Walter, Eugene Ormandy, Georg Solti, Zubin Mehta, Carlo Maria Giulini, Valeri Gergiev, and Simon Rattle, among many others.

When the board of directors of the Master Chorale and Wagner parted ways in 1986, Wagner recommended Salamunovich to replace him; however, Salamunovich declined the board's invitation to submit audition materials, citing extensive prior conducting commitments booked for the next two years at festivals and all-states beyond even his normal academic and liturgical commitments. The board instead hired Scottish conductor John Currie as music director.  Currie held the position until the end of the 1991 season; Salamunovich then accepted the Master Chorale's invitation and became its music director in January 1991, effective the fall of that year.  "I'm sort of like the prodigal son, come back," Salamunovich said.  "My choral heritage is this group."

Once he took over the Master Chorale, Salamunovich set out to restore the signature sound that existed for many years before Currie's tenure.  As many insiders already knew, Salamunovich was more responsible for that sound, having led the chorale in the vast majority of their rehearsals as assistant conductor until his departure in 1977. "I expect to take back your tone about 25 years," Salamunovich told his singers at his first rehearsal as music director. "The choir has been top-heavy, very top-heavy. I want to get back to a pyramid blend, to the sound of an over-tone choir."  In later interviews with the Los Angeles Times, his approach was described as follows:
'"The smooth line of Gregorian chant is the goal," Salamunovich says. So is "looseness": releasing the muscles as if "throwing up." Articulation and audience comprehension too are ongoing themes. Not just diction but the quality of sound should convey meaning, the conductor maintains. "The foundation is built on the male voices. . . . I don't allow the sopranos to override them. I take the growl out of the basses and the ping out of the tenors. It's a kinder, gentler tone that says 'I love you.' " 

He replaced Currie's bright, operatic sound with a warmer and richer sonority, mellow and blended "with the energy – or, should I say, foundation of the sound – coming from the lower voices."

His sound, though initially influenced by Wagner's, is more nimble and less heavy, becoming lyrical when the style of the piece requires it. Salamunovich describes it as "fervently with passion." The uniquely recognizable sound has become known as the "Salamunovich Sound," and he was able to achieve the same recognizable tone and phrasing from every group he conducted, even though each group contained a different set of voices and levels of expertise. Roger Wagner once said, "Paul, you make them sing the way you sang." Strangely, a myth persists in the public that Wagner tutored Salamunovich in some way and Wagner himself perpetuated that myth in the book, "The Voice of The Chorale," in which he claimed to have "taught that man (Salamunovich) practically everything I could teach anybody." The book was published in 1993; by then Salamunovich had been the conductor of the Master Chorale for three seasons marked by great acclaim for bringing the group to an artistic renaissance, and back from the brink of the tremendous financial and artistic challenges it faced before his arrival. A far more accurate accounting of the situation is that Wagner "utilized" Salamunovich as a frequent replacement so Wagner could be free to do other things, starting with Salamunovich's appointment to St. Charles Borromeo in North Hollywood, his first conducting position in 1949. Wagner decided to abandon the position because it didn't pay as well as other opportunities he was offered at other churches, and needed to find a replacement in order to make his exit. As the actual story goes, Wagner took Salamunovich to meet Pastor Monsignor Harry C. Meade and convinced him that the 21-year-old Salamunovich could not only conduct but could play the organ, neither of which was true at the time. Upon selling the pastor on the idea of his replacement, Wagner then gave Salamunovich the only conducting lesson he ever received from him and showed him the conducting patterns for the meters of the 2, 3 and 4/4 time signatures. When the terrified Salamunovich asked him, "What do I do now?" Wagner is reported to have said, "Practice!" No other pedagogic relationship existed between the two, although Salamunovich claimed Wagner as a mentor due to the opportunities Wagner gave him, and the fact that he would not have otherwise sought a career in conducting on his own. This was a distinction he shared with his contemporary and good friend, the great Robert Shaw, who also didn't initially seek a career in conducting. Both however, found themselves continually asked to do so until they eventually made conducting their careers. Salamunovich eulogized his friend at Shaw's funeral in 1999.

Salamunovich led the Los Angeles Master Chorale and Sinfonia Orchestra for ten years, during which time he selected a broad range of repertoire, from Renaissance pieces by 16th-century composers such as Giovanni Pierluigi da Palestrina and Tomás Luis de Victoria, the Classical and Romantic masterworks of Haydn, Mozart, Beethoven, and Brahms, to modern works, most notably those written by Morten Lauridsen, the Master Chorale's Composer-in-Residence from 1994 through 2001.  "There's not a note I've written over these years in which I didn't have Paul and the unique sound he achieves with the Master Chorale in mind," Lauridsen once said. "The way phrases are put together and melody is created—I always write for them."  This relationship between conductor and composer resulted in works such as O Magnum Mysterium, Lux Aeterna, and—written for Salamunovich's 70th birthday – Ave Maria. Salamunovich is also known for his interpretations of the 20th-century French composer Maurice Duruflé, whose compositions for orchestra and chorus are based upon chant motifs. Salamunovich prepared the St. Charles Choir for a Los Angeles performance of Durufle's Requiem with the composer conducting in November 1971. It was their only meeting, and with Salamunovich speaking no French and Duruflé speaking no English, their communication was left almost entirely to the music. Years later, one of Salamunovich's students toured the composer's home in Paris (now a museum curated by the Duruflé Society) and found a framed photograph of Salamunovich and Duruflé on the wall some 40 years later, commemorating their brief but memorable collaboration.

Upon retiring as Music Director of the Los Angeles Master Chorale in 2001, he was immediately named Music Director Emeritus, a title he held until his death.  Salamunovich returned to the Chorale as guest conductor in 2005, making his debut in Disney Hall in a sold-out concert. He was one of the most in-demand choral clinicians, having conducted almost 1000 workshops and festivals throughout the United States, Canada, the Bahamas, South America, Europe, Australia, and the Far East.  He led the St. Petersburg Philharmonic and the Master Chorale of the United States as part of the annual Festival of Sacred Music at the Basilica of St. John Lateran in Rome in November 2003. In 2012, he was an inaugural inductee to the Loyola Marymount University Faculty Hall of Fame.

Salamunovich was stricken with the West Nile virus in September 2013. After a seven-month battle to recover from the illness, he died from multiple complications on April 3, 2014, in Sherman Oaks, California. His rosary was held at St. Charles Borromeo on May 2, 2014. His funeral the following day at Blessed Sacrament Church in Hollywood was attended by over a thousand people. As was the custom with members of the St. Charles Choir who died, the choir came out of the choir loft and sat downstairs near the casket as family. The entire congregation was given music and singers from all the various choirs he conducted sang the Mass presided over by 14 priests, including Cardinal Roger Mahony. He is buried at Holy Cross Cemetery.

Choral Legacy
In listening to the groups that Salamunovich led full-time at the professional, collegiate and church levels as well as his numerous guest conducting positions around the world, it is noteworthy that he managed to get his signature sound and interpretation no matter what level of ability the singers possessed. He also managed to accomplish this in a remarkably short amount of rehearsal time. His rehearsals were performances in themselves in which his analogies and "word pictures" turned subjective concepts into definable sounds that could immediately be grasped by the singers he conducted. Given his years conducting church choirs while having to play the organ, Salamunovich developed the use of his facial expressions almost like another set of hands to communicate the tone and vocal "shape" he wanted from the choir. He was noted for saying that singing was like acting and the facial expressions added a much more dramatic extension to the sounds he was able to bring forth. When conducting only, the use of BOTH his hands and face allowed him a much more intimate and precise communication with the choir and orchestra. His extremely successful international career as a choral clinician is a testament to his prodigious abilities as a teacher of the choral arts. An especially remarkable footnote to Salamunovich's entire career is he never set out to be a conductor and had never asked for an appointment in his life. Every single post or engagement he ever accepted was offered to him. He also never studied conducting and learned by doing largely due to the early situations in which he found himself. What is also noteworthy is his first post as a church choir conductor, is typically an entry-level post. Yet Salamunovich kept that first position his entire career while ascending up the ranks to the pinnacle of preeminent, American, choral conductors. He would regularly schedule his professional conducting duties on the international and national levels around his church duties so that he could be in the choir loft at St. Charles every Sunday (excluding summers) with rare exceptions. His students populate choral podiums around the world many of whom regularly cite his stories and analogies to their own singers. After being named Chairman of The Joint Chiefs of Staff, Admiral Michael Mullen sent Salamunovich a signed photo telling him that his experiences under Salamunovich as a boy choir member, factored heavily into all the success that followed in his career. Although Salamunovich was never able to use a computer, a Facebook page dedicated to him by former students numbers over one thousand members who regularly post stories, photos, recordings and videos. The Paul Salamunovich papers are curated at the University of Southern California Library's Special Collections Department. They comprise all his marked scores as well as historical photos and correspondences and are available for study.

Academic positions
 Mount St. Mary's College:  music faculty for 18 years
 Loyola Marymount University:  music faculty (1964–1990), Director of Choral Activities, named Professor Emeritus in 1993, inaugural inductee to the Loyola Marymount Faculty Hall of Fame in 2012.
 USC Thornton School of Music:  Adjunct Professor of Choral Music, Director of the USC Thornton Chamber Choir (2007–2008)

He also held two honorary doctorates from Loyola Marymount University and the University of St. Thomas (Minnesota).

In addition, he taught 831 clinics and workshops throughout the U.S., Canada, South America, the Bahamas, Europe, Australia and the Far East.

Papal audiences
In addition to his 2003 appearances at the Vatican, Salamunovich led the St. Charles Borromeo choir in three other performances for Pope John Paul II:
In 1988, they sang at the Mass for the Feast of Saints Peter and Paul with Pope John Paul II presiding in St. Peter's Square in Rome.  This was the only American choir ever invited to sing at this occasion.
In 1987, they performed at the Cathedral of Saint Vibiana for the official welcome of the Pontiff to the City of Los Angeles
In 1985, they performed for the Pope in a private audience in Clementine Hall of the Vatican Palace.

Death
After becoming ill with the West Nile virus in September, 2013,  Paul Salamunovich died at the age of 86 on April 3, 2014, at a hospital in Sherman Oaks, California, of complications of the disease. After hearing that he had passed while listening to a recording of the "In Paradisum" movement from his final performance of the Durufle' Requiem with the Master Chorale, KUSC played a performance he conducted when he taught there in 2008 as a memorial radio tribute three days later. His rosary was held at St. Charles Borromeo on May 2, 2014. His funeral was held the next day at Blessed Sacrament Church in Hollywood as St. Charles was deemed too small to house the roughly 1800 people who attended. As was the custom with members of the St. Charles Choir who died, the choir came out of the choir loft and sat downstairs near the casket as family. The entire congregation was given music and singers from all the various choirs he conducted, sang the Mass which was presided over by some 14 priests which included Cardinal Roger Mahoney. Pallbearers included composer and frequent collaborator Morten Lauridsen. He is buried at Holy Cross Cemetery.

Recordings and DVDs

Los Angeles Master Chorale releases
 Lux Aeterna by Morten Lauridsen (also featuring other Lauridsen works:  Chansons des Roses, Ave Maria, Mid-Winter Songs, and O Magnum mMsterium) (RCM) Grammy Nomination for Best Choral Performance, 1998.
 Dominic Argento's Te Deum  and Missa "Cum Jubilo" by Maurice Duruflé (with Rodney Gilfry as baritone soloist and Frederick Swann on organ (RCM))
 Christmas, a collection of songs (RCM)

Los Angeles Philharmonic releases
 Claude Debussy, Trois nocturnes and La Damoiselle élue, Esa-Pekka Salonen conducting (Sony Classics)
 Gustav Mahler, Symphony No. 3, Esa-Pekka Salonen conducting (Sony Classics)

Hollywood Bowl Orchestra releases
 Rodgers & Hammerstein, The King & I,	John Mauceri conducting (Phillips Classics)
 Schoenberg/Ravel, Earth Day, John Mauceri conducting (Phillips Classics)
 Hollywood Nightmares (various composers), John Mauceri conducting (Phillips Classics)

DVD
 "Choral Perspectives: Paul Salamunovich, Chant and Beyond" (2007), a documentary released by Hal Leonard Publishing

Motion picture and TV work

Salamunovich was responsible for choral music for over 100 film and TV productions, including The Godfather, Angels and Demons, First Knight, Air Force One, A.I., XXX, Peter Pan, Flatliners, ER, The Sum of All Fears, and Cirque du Soleil's Journey of Man.  He coached Robert De Niro in Latin for the role of a priest in True Confessions in addition to conducting the choir for that movie.

His St. Charles Borromeo choir appeared with Henry Mancini and Doc Severinsen in the NBC Christmas Eve Special The Sounds of Christmas that ran for several years in place of The Tonight Show on Christmas Eve, while the boy choir has been featured on television on The Lucy Show and with Dinah Shore in the Chevy Show. His St. Charles Boy's Choir appeared as the Disneyland Boys Choir on the original Disney album, It's A Small World.

Awards and recognition

 Knight Commander of The Order of St Gregory the Great 1969
 "Distinguished Artist Award" from the Music Center of Los Angeles County (1995)
 "Lifetime Achievement Award" from the American Choral Directors Association (2000)
 Grammy nomination for recording of "Lux Aeterna" and other choral works by Morten Lauridsen 1997
 Pro Ecclesia et Pontifice The highest Papal award given to laity. 2013

References

External links

Paul Salamunovich dies at 86; led L.A. Master Chorale for 10 years
Many Voices, but One Man's Sound-The Los Angeles Times
Paul Salamunovich Singers.com
The Paul Salamunovich Facebook Fanpage
Loyola Marymount University Faculty Hall of Fame: Paul Salamunovich
Tribute to Paul Salamunovich LMU
Reflections on Lux Aeterna with Morten Lauridsen and Paul Salamunovich Video by Michael Stillman
Paul Salamunovich “We Tenors” – Leadership Lessons from the Choir Room
Los Angeles Master Chorale Lauridsen/Salamunovich-Video
Jo Michael Scheibe Remembers Paul Salamunovich

1927 births
2014 deaths
American choral conductors
American male conductors (music)
American people of Croatian descent
American Roman Catholics
Classical musicians from California
Loyola Marymount University faculty
Mount St. Mary's University (Los Angeles) faculty
Musicians from Redondo Beach, California
USC Thornton School of Music faculty